Alpha Doradus, Latinized from α Doradus, is the brightest star in the southern constellation of Dorado.

This is a binary star system with an overall apparent visual magnitude that varies between 3.26 and 3.30, making this one of the brightest binary stars. The system consists of a subgiant star of spectral type B revolving around a giant star with spectral type A in an eccentric orbit with a period of about 12 years. The orbital separation varies from 2 astronomical units at periastron to 17.5 astronomical units at apastron. The primary, α Doradus A, is a chemically peculiar star whose atmosphere displays an abnormally high abundance of silicon, making this an Si star.

Alpha Doradus has an optical companion, CCDM J04340-5503C, located 77 arcseconds away along a position angle of 94°. It has no physical relation to the other two stars.

References

A-type giants
B-type subgiants
Alpha2 Canum Venaticorum variables
Binary stars

Dorado (constellation)
Doradus, Alpha
CD-55 00916
029305
021281
1465